The Battle of Savo Island, also known as the First Battle of Savo Island and, in Japanese sources, as the , and colloquially among Allied Guadalcanal veterans as the Battle of the Five Sitting Ducks, was a naval battle of the Solomon Islands campaign of the Pacific War of World War II between the Imperial Japanese Navy and Allied naval forces. The battle took place on August 8–9, 1942, and was the first major naval engagement of the Guadalcanal campaign, and the first of several naval battles in the straits later-named Ironbottom Sound, near the island of Guadalcanal.

The Imperial Japanese Navy, in response to Allied amphibious landings in the eastern Solomon Islands, mobilized a task force of seven cruisers and one destroyer under the command of Vice Admiral Gunichi Mikawa. The task forces sailed from Japanese bases in New Britain and New Ireland down New Georgia Sound (also known as "the Slot"), with the intention of interrupting the Allied landings by attacking the supporting amphibious fleet and its screening force. The Allied screen consisted of eight cruisers and fifteen destroyers under Rear Admiral Victor Crutchley, but only five cruisers and seven destroyers were involved in the battle. In a night action, Mikawa thoroughly surprised and routed the Allied force, sinking one Australian and three American cruisers, while suffering only light damage in return.  Rear Admiral Samuel J. Cox, director of the Naval History and Heritage Command, considers this battle and the Battle of Tassafaronga to be two of the worst defeats in U.S. naval history, second only to Pearl Harbor.

After the initial engagement, Mikawa, fearing Allied carrier strikes against his fleet in daylight, decided to withdraw under cover of night rather than attempt to locate and destroy the Allied invasion transports. The Japanese attacks prompted the remaining Allied warships and the amphibious force to withdraw earlier than planned (before unloading all supplies), temporarily ceding control of the seas around Guadalcanal to the Japanese.  This early withdrawal of the fleet left the Allied ground forces (primarily United States Marines), which had landed on Guadalcanal and nearby islands only two days before, in a precarious situation, with limited supplies, equipment, and food to hold their beachhead.

Mikawa's decision to withdraw under cover of night rather than attempt to destroy the Allied invasion transports was primarily founded on concern over possible Allied carrier strikes against his fleet in daylight. In reality, the Allied carrier fleet, similarly fearing Japanese attack, had already withdrawn beyond operational range.  This missed opportunity to cripple (rather than interrupt) the supply of Allied forces on Guadalcanal contributed to Japan's failure to recapture the island.  At this critical early stage of the campaign, it allowed the Allied forces to entrench and fortify themselves sufficiently to defend the area around Henderson Field until additional Allied reinforcements arrived later in the year.

The battle was the first of five costly, large-scale sea and air-sea actions fought in support of the ground battles on Guadalcanal itself, as the Japanese sought to counter the American offensive in the Pacific. These sea battles took place after increasing delays by each side to regroup and refit, until the November 30, 1942 Battle of Tassafaronga – after which the Japanese, eschewing the costly losses, attempted resupplying by submarine and barges. The final naval battle, the Battle of Rennell Island, took place months later on January 29–30, 1943, by which time the Japanese were preparing to evacuate their remaining land forces and withdraw.

Background

Operations at Guadalcanal

On August 7, 1942, Allied forces (primarily U.S. Marines) landed on Guadalcanal, Tulagi, and Florida Island in the eastern Solomon Islands. The landings were meant to deny their use to the Japanese as bases, especially the nearly completed airfield at Henderson Field that was being constructed on Guadalcanal. If Japanese air and sea forces were allowed to establish forward operating bases in the Eastern Solomons, they would be in a position to threaten the supply shipping routes between the U.S. and Australia. The Allies also wanted to use the islands as launching points for a campaign to recapture the Solomons, isolate or capture the major Japanese base at Rabaul, and support the Allied New Guinea campaign, which was then building strength under General Douglas MacArthur. The landings initiated the six-month-long Guadalcanal campaign.

The overall commander of Allied naval forces in the Guadalcanal and Tulagi operation was U.S. Vice Admiral Frank Jack Fletcher. He also commanded the carrier task groups providing air cover. U.S. Rear Admiral Richmond K. Turner commanded the amphibious fleet that delivered the 16,000 Allied troops to Guadalcanal and Tulagi.  Also under Turner was Rear Admiral Victor Crutchley's screening force of eight cruisers, fifteen destroyers, and five minesweepers. This force was to protect Turner's ships and provide gunfire support for the landings. Crutchley commanded his force of mostly American ships from his flagship, the Australian heavy cruiser .

The Allied landings took the Japanese by surprise. The Allies secured Tulagi, nearby islets Gavutu and Tanambogo, and the airfield under construction on Guadalcanal by nightfall on August 8.  On August 7 and 8, Japanese aircraft based at Rabaul attacked the Allied amphibious forces several times, setting afire the U.S. transport ship  (which sank later) and heavily damaging the destroyer .  In these air attacks, the Japanese lost 36 aircraft, while the U.S. lost 19 aircraft, including 14 carrier-based fighter aircraft.

Concerned over the losses to his carrier fighter aircraft strength, anxious about the threat to his carriers from further Japanese air attacks, and worried about his ships' fuel levels, Fletcher announced that he would withdraw his carrier task forces on the evening of August 8.

Some historians contend that Fletcher's fuel situation was not at all critical but that Fletcher used it to justify his withdrawal from the battle area.  Fletcher's biographer notes that Fletcher concluded that the landing was a success and that no important targets for close air support were at hand.  Being concerned over the loss of 21 of his carrier fighters, he assessed that his carriers were threatened by torpedo-bomber strikes, and, wanting to refuel before Japanese naval forces arrived, withdrew as he had previously forewarned Turner and Vandegrift. Turner, however, believed that Fletcher understood that he was to provide air cover until all the transports were unloaded on August 9.

Even though the unloading was going more slowly than planned, Turner decided that without carrier air cover, he would have to withdraw his ships from Guadalcanal. He planned to unload as much as possible during the night and depart the next day.

Japanese response
Unprepared for the Allied operation at Guadalcanal, the initial Japanese response included airstrikes and an attempted reinforcement. Mikawa, commander of the newly formed Japanese Eighth Fleet headquartered at Rabaul, loaded 519 naval troops on two transports and sent them towards Guadalcanal on August 7. When the Japanese learned that Allied forces at Guadalcanal were stronger than originally reported, the transports were recalled.

Mikawa also assembled all the available warships in the area to attack the Allied forces at Guadalcanal.

The Japanese Navy had trained extensively in night-fighting tactics before the war, a fact of which the Allies were unaware. Mikawa hoped to engage the Allied naval forces off Guadalcanal and Tulagi on the night of August 8 and 9, when he could employ his night-battle expertise while avoiding attacks from Allied aircraft, which could not operate effectively at night. Mikawa's warships rendezvoused at sea near Cape St. George in the evening of August 7 and then headed east-southeast.

Battle

Prelude

Mikawa decided to take his fleet north of Buka Island and then down the east coast of Bougainville. The fleet paused east of Kieta for six hours on the morning of August 8 to avoid daytime air attacks during its final approach to Guadalcanal. Mikawa proceeded along the dangerous channel known as "The Slot", hoping that no Allied plane would see them in the fading light. The Japanese fleet was in fact sighted in St George Channel, where the column almost ran into , lying in ambush. She was too close to fire torpedoes, but her captain, Lieutenant Commander H.G. Munson, radioed: "Two destroyers and three larger ships of unknown type heading one four zero true at high speed eight miles west of Cape St George" Once at Bougainville, Mikawa spread his ships out over a wide area to mask the composition of his force and launched four floatplanes from his cruisers to scout for Allied ships in the southern Solomons. At 10:20 and 11:10, his ships were spotted by Royal Australian Air Force (RAAF) Hudson reconnaissance aircraft based at Milne Bay in New Guinea.  The first Hudson misidentified them as "three cruisers, three destroyers, and two seaplane tenders". (Note: Some accounts state that the first Hudson's crew identified the enemy ships correctly, but the composition of enemy forces was changed from the aircraft crews' report by intelligence officers in Milne Bay.) The Hudson's crew tried to report the sighting to the Allied radio station at Fall River, New Guinea. Receiving no acknowledgment, they returned to Milne Bay at 12:42 to ensure that the report was received as soon as possible. The second Hudson also failed to report its sighting by radio, but completed its patrol and landed at Milne Bay at 15:00. It reported sighting "two heavy cruisers, two light cruisers, and one unknown type". For unknown reasons, these reports were not relayed to the Allied fleet off Guadalcanal until 18:45 and 21:30, respectively, on August 8. U.S. official historian Samuel Morison wrote in his 1949 account that the RAAF Hudson's crew failed to report the sighting until after they had landed and even had tea. This claim made international headlines and was repeated by many subsequent historians. Later research has discredited this version of events, and in 2014, the U.S. Navy's Naval History and Heritage Command acknowledged in a letter to the Hudson's radio operator, who had lobbied for decades to clear his crewmates' name, that Morison's criticisms were "unwarranted."

Mikawa's floatplanes returned around 12:00 and reported two groups of Allied ships, one off Guadalcanal and the other off Tulagi. At 13:45, the cruiser force was near Choiseul south-east of Bougainville. At that time, several surviving Japanese aircraft from the noon torpedo raid on the Allied ships off the coast of Guadalcanal flew over the cruisers on the way back to Rabaul and gave them waves of encouragement. Mikawa entered New Georgia Sound (later dubbed as "the Slot") by 16:00 and began his run towards Guadalcanal. He communicated the following battle plan to his warships: "On the rush-in we will go from S. (south) of Savo Island and torpedo the enemy main force in front of Guadalcanal anchorage; after which we will turn toward the Tulagi forward area to shell and torpedo the enemy. We will then withdraw north of Savo Island."

Mikawa's run down the Slot was not detected by Allied forces. Turner had requested that U.S. Admiral John S. McCain Sr., commander of Allied air forces for the South Pacific area, conduct extra reconnaissance missions over the Slot in the afternoon of August 8. But, for unexplained reasons, McCain did not order the missions, nor did he tell Turner that they were not carried out. Thus, Turner mistakenly believed that the Slot was under Allied observation throughout the day. However, McCain cannot totally bear fault, as his patrol craft were few in number, and operated over a vast area at the extreme limit of their endurance.  Turner had fifteen scouting planes of the cruiser force, which were never used that afternoon and remained on the decks of their cruisers, filled with gasoline and serving as an explosive hazard to the cruisers.

To protect the unloading transports during the night, Crutchley divided the Allied warship forces into three groups. Crutchley placed two radar-equipped U.S. destroyers to the west of Savo Island to provide early warning for any approaching Japanese ships. At this time, the Allies were unaware of all of the limitations of their primitive ship-borne radars, such as that the effectiveness of the radar could be greatly degraded by the presence of nearby landmasses. Chicagos Captain Bode ordered his ship's radar to be used only intermittently out of concern that it would reveal his position, a decision that conformed with general Navy radar usage guidelines, but which may have been incorrect in this specific circumstance. He allowed a single sweep every half hour with the fire control radar, but the timing of the last pre-engagement sweep was too early to detect the approaching Japanese cruisers. Wary of the potential threat from Japanese submarines to the transport ships, Crutchley placed his remaining seven destroyers as close-in protection around the two transport anchorages.

The crews of the Allied ships were fatigued after two days of constant alert and action in supporting the landings. Also, the weather was extremely hot and humid, inducing further fatigue and, in Morison's words, "inviting weary sailors to slackness." In response, most of Crutchley's warships went to "Condition II" the night of August 8, which meant that half the crews were on duty while the other half rested, either in their bunks or near their battle stations.

In the evening, Turner called a conference on his command ship off Guadalcanal with Crutchley and Marine commander Major General Alexander A. Vandegrift to discuss the departure of Fletcher's carriers and the resulting withdrawal schedule for the transport ships. At 20:55, Crutchley left the southern group in Australia to attend the conference, leaving Captain Howard D. Bode of Chicago in charge of the southern group. Crutchley did not inform the commanders of the other cruiser groups of his absence, contributing further to the dissolution of command arrangements. Bode, awakened from sleep in his cabin, decided not to place his ship in the lead of the southern group of ships, the customary place for the senior ship and went back to sleep. At the conference, Turner, Crutchley, and Vandegrift discussed the reports of the "seaplane tender" force reported by the Australian Hudson crew earlier that day. They decided that it would not be a threat that night, because seaplane tenders did not normally engage in a surface action. Vandegrift said that he would need to inspect the transport unloading situation at Tulagi before recommending a withdrawal time for the transport ships, and he departed at midnight to conduct the inspection. Crutchley elected not to return with Australia to the southern force but instead stationed his ship just outside the Guadalcanal transport anchorage, without informing the other Allied ship commanders of his intentions or location.

As Mikawa's force neared the Guadalcanal area, the Japanese ships launched three floatplanes for one final reconnaissance of the Allied ships, and to provide illumination by dropping flares during the upcoming battle. Although several of the Allied ships heard and/or observed one or more of these floatplanes, starting at 23:45 on August 8, none of them interpreted the presence of unknown aircraft in the area as an actionable threat, and no one reported the sightings to Crutchley or Turner.

Mikawa's force approached in a single  column led by Chōkai, with Aoba, Kako, Kinugasa, Furutaka, Tenryū, Yūbari, and Yūnagi following. Sometime between 00:44 and 00:54 on August 9, lookouts in Mikawa's ships spotted Blue about  ahead of the Japanese column.

Action south of Savo
To avoid Blue, Mikawa changed course to pass north of Savo Island. The Japanese ships held their course while pointing more than 50 guns at Blue, ready to open fire at the first indication that Blue had sighted them. At 01:25, Mikawa released his ships to operate independently of his flagship, and at 01:31, he ordered, "Every ship attack."

At about this time, Yūnagi detached from the Japanese column and reversed direction, perhaps because she lost sight of the other Japanese ships ahead of her, or perhaps she was ordered to provide a rearguard for Mikawa's force. One minute later, Japanese lookouts sighted a warship to port. This ship was the destroyer , heavily damaged the day before and now departing Guadalcanal independently for repairs in Australia. Whether Jarvis sighted the Japanese ships is unknown, since her radios had been destroyed. Furutaka launched torpedoes at Jarvis, which all missed. If Jarvis was aware of the Japanese ships passing by, she did not respond in any noticeable way and was torpedoed and sunk the following day by aircraft from Rabaul. There were no survivors.

Several minutes later, at about 01:38, the Japanese cruisers began launching salvos of torpedoes at the Allied southern force ships. Chōkai turned to face this new threat, and the rest of the Japanese column followed, while still preparing to engage the Allied southern force ships with gunfire.

Pattersons crew was alert because the destroyer's captain had taken seriously the earlier daytime sightings of Japanese warships and evening sightings of unknown aircraft, and told his crew to be ready for action. At 01:43, Patterson spotted a ship, probably Kinugasa,  dead ahead and immediately sent a warning by radio and signal lamp: "Warning! Warning! Strange ships entering the harbor!" Patterson increased speed to full, and fired star shells towards the Japanese column. Her captain ordered a torpedo attack, but his order was not heard over the noise from the destroyer's guns.

At about the same moment that Patterson sighted the Japanese ships and went into action, the Japanese floatplanes overhead, on orders from Mikawa, dropped aerial flares directly over Canberra and Chicago.  Canberra responded immediately, with Captain Frank Getting ordering an increase in speed, a reversal of an initial turn to port, which kept Canberra between the Japanese and the Allied transports, and for her guns to train out and fire at any targets that could be sighted.  Less than one minute later, as Canberras guns took aim at the Japanese, Chōkai and Furutaka opened fire on her, scoring numerous hits within a few seconds. Aoba and Kako joined in with gunfire, and within the next three minutes Canberra took up to 24 large-caliber hits. Early hits killed her gunnery officer, mortally wounded Getting, and destroyed both boiler rooms, knocking out power to the entire ship before Canberra could fire any of her guns or communicate a warning to other Allied ships.  The cruiser glided to a stop, on fire, with a 5- to 10-degree list to starboard, and unable to fight the fires or pump out flooded compartments because of lack of power. Since all of the Japanese ships were on the port side of Canberra, the damage to the ship's starboard side occurred either from shells entering low on the port side and exiting below the waterline on the starboard side, or from one or two torpedo hits on the starboard side.  If torpedoes did hit Canberra on the starboard side, then they may have come from a nearby Allied ship, and at this time the U.S. destroyer Bagley was the only ship on that side of the Australian cruiser and had fired torpedoes moments earlier.

The crew of Chicago, observing the illumination of their ship by air-dropped flares and the sudden turn by Canberra in front of them, came alert and awakened Captain Bode from "a sound sleep".  Bode ordered his  guns to fire star shells towards the Japanese column, but the shells did not function.  At 01:47, a torpedo, probably from Kako, hit Chicagos bow, sending a shock wave throughout the ship that damaged the main battery director. A second torpedo hit but failed to explode, and a shell hit the cruiser's mainmast, killing two crewmen. Chicago steamed west for 40 minutes,  leaving behind the transports she was assigned to protect. The cruiser fired her secondary batteries at the trailing ships in the Japanese column and may have hit Tenryū, causing slight damage. Bode did not try to assert control over any of the other Allied ships in the southern force, of which he was still technically in command. More significantly, Bode made no attempt to warn any of the other Allied ships or personnel in the Guadalcanal area as his ship headed away from the battle area.

During this time, Patterson engaged in a gun duel with the Japanese column. Patterson received a shell hit aft, causing moderate damage and killing 10 crew members. Patterson continued to pursue and fire at the Japanese ships and may have hit Kinugasa, causing moderate damage. Patterson then lost sight of the Japanese column as it headed northeast along the eastern shore of Savo Island. Bagley, whose crew sighted the Japanese shortly after Patterson and Canberra, circled completely around to port before firing torpedoes in the general direction of the rapidly disappearing Japanese column; one or two of which may have hit Canberra. Bagley played no further role in the battle. Yūnagi exchanged non-damaging gunfire with Jarvis before exiting the battle area to the west with the intention of eventually rejoining the Japanese column north and west of Savo Island.

At 01:44, as Mikawa's ships headed towards the Allied northern force, Tenryū and Yūbari split from the rest of the Japanese column and took a more westward course. Furutaka, either because of a steering problem, or to avoid a possible collision with Canberra, followed Yūbari and Tenryū. Thus, the Allied northern force was about to be enveloped and attacked from two sides.

Action north of Savo

Although crewmen on all three ships observed flares or gunfire from the battle south of Savo or else received Pattersons warning of threatening ships entering the area, it took some time for the crews to go from Condition II to full alert. At 01:44, the Japanese cruisers began firing torpedoes at the northern force. At 01:50, they aimed powerful searchlights at the three northern cruisers and opened fire with their guns.

Astorias bridge crew called general quarters upon sighting the flares south of Savo, around 01:49. At 01:52, shortly after the Japanese searchlights came on and shells began falling around the ship, Astorias main gun director crews spotted the Japanese cruisers and opened fire. Astorias captain, awakened to find his ship in action, rushed to the bridge and ordered a ceasefire, fearful that his ship might be firing on friendly forces. As shells continued to cascade around his ship, the captain ordered firing resumed less than a minute later. Chōkai had found the range, and Astoria was quickly hit by numerous shells and set afire. Between 02:00 and 02:15, Aoba, Kinugasa, and Kako joined Chōkai in pounding Astoria, destroying the cruiser's engine room and bringing the flaming ship to a halt. At 02:16, one of Astorias remaining operational main gun turrets fired at Kinugasas searchlight, but missed and hit one of Chōkais forward turrets, putting the turret out of action and causing moderate damage to the ship. Astoria sank at 12:16 after all attempts to save her failed.

Quincy had also seen the aircraft flares over the southern ships, received Pattersons warning, and had just sounded general quarters and was coming alert when the searchlights from the Japanese column came on. Quincys captain gave the order to commence firing, but the gun crews were not ready. Within a few minutes, Quincy was caught in a crossfire between Aoba, Furutaka, and Tenryū, and was hit heavily and set afire. Quincys captain ordered his cruiser to charge towards the eastern Japanese column, but as she turned to do so Quincy was hit by two torpedoes from Tenryū, causing severe damage. Quincy managed to fire a few main gun salvos, one of which hit Chōkais chart room  from Admiral Mikawa and killed or wounded 36 men, although Mikawa was not injured. At 02:10, incoming shells killed or wounded almost all of Quincys bridge crew, including the captain. At 02:16, the cruiser was hit by a torpedo from Aoba, and the ship's remaining guns were silenced.  Quincys assistant gunnery officer, sent to the bridge to ask for instructions, reported on what he found:

Quincy sank, bow first, at 02:38.

Like Quincy and Astoria, Vincennes also sighted the aerial flares to the south, and furthermore, actually sighted gunfire from the southern engagement. At 01:50, when the U.S. cruisers were illuminated by the Japanese searchlights, Vincennes hesitated to open fire, believing that the searchlight's source might be friendly ships. Shortly thereafter, Kako opened fire on Vincennes which responded with her own gunfire at 01:53. Kinugasa now joined Kako in pounding Vincennes. Vincennes scored one hit on Kinugasa causing moderate damage to her steering engines. The rest of the Japanese ships also fired and hit Vincennes up to 74 times, and, at 02:03, another torpedo hit her, this time from Yūbari. With all boiler rooms destroyed, Vincennes came to a halt, burning "everywhere" and listing to port. At 02:16, Riefkohl ordered the crew to abandon ship, and Vincennes sank at 02:50.

During the engagement, the U.S. destroyers Helm and Wilson struggled to see the Japanese ships. Both destroyers briefly fired at Mikawa's cruisers but caused no damage and received no damage to themselves.

At 02:16, the Japanese columns ceased fire on the northern Allied force as they moved out of range around the north side of Savo Island. Ralph Talbot encountered Furutaka, Tenryū, and Yūbari as they cleared Savo Island.  The Japanese ships fixed the U.S. destroyer with searchlights and hit her several times with gunfire, causing heavy damage, but Ralph Talbot escaped into a nearby rain squall, and the Japanese ships left her behind.

Mikawa's decision
At 02:16 Mikawa conferred with his staff about whether they should turn to continue the battle with the surviving Allied warships and try to sink the Allied transports in the two anchorages. Several factors influenced his ultimate decision. His ships were scattered and would take some time to regroup. His ships would need to reload their torpedo tubes, a labor-intensive task that would take some time. Mikawa also did not know the number and locations of any remaining Allied warships and his ships had expended much of their ammunition.

More importantly, Mikawa had no air cover and believed that U.S. aircraft carriers were in the area. Mikawa was probably aware that the Japanese Navy had no more heavy cruisers in production, and thus would be unable to replace any he might lose to air attack the next day if he remained near Guadalcanal. He was unaware that the U.S. carriers had withdrawn from the battle area and would not be a threat the next day. Although several of Mikawa's staff urged an attack on the Allied transports, the consensus was to withdraw from the battle area.  Therefore, at 02:20, Mikawa ordered his ships to retire.

Aftermath

Allied

At 04:00 on August 9, Patterson came alongside Canberra to assist the cruiser in fighting her fires. By 05:00, it appeared that the fires were almost under control, but Turner, who at this time intended to withdraw all Allied ships by 06:30, ordered the ship to be scuttled if she was not able to accompany the fleet. After the survivors were removed, the destroyers  and  sank Canberra, which took some 300 shells and five torpedoes.

Later in the morning of August 9, General Vandegrift advised Admiral Turner that he needed more supplies unloaded from the transports before they withdrew. Therefore, Turner postponed the withdrawal of his ships until mid-afternoon. In the meantime, Astorias crew tried to save their sinking ship. Astorias fires eventually became completely out of control, and the ship sank at 12:15.

On the morning of August 9, an Australian coastwatcher on Bougainville radioed a warning of a Japanese airstrike on the way from Rabaul. The Allied transport crews ceased unloading for a time, but were puzzled when the airstrike did not materialize. Allied forces did not discover until after the war was over that this Japanese airstrike instead concentrated on Jarvis south of Guadalcanal, sinking her with all hands. The Allied transports and warships all departed the Guadalcanal area by nightfall on August 9. During the naval surface battle of Savo Island, three U.S. heavy cruisers, Astoria, Quincy, and Vincennes, and one Australian heavy cruiser, Canberra, were sunk or scuttled.

 spent the next 6 months in drydock, returned to Guadalcanal in late January 1943 and was promptly finished off for good in the campaign's last engagement: the Battle of Rennell Island.

Japanese
In the late evening of August 9, Mikawa on Chōkai released the four cruisers of Cruiser Division 6 to return to their home base at Kavieng. At 08:10 on August 10, Kako was torpedoed and sunk by the submarine   from her destination. The other three Japanese cruisers picked up all but 71 of her crew and went on to Kavieng.

Admiral Yamamoto signaled a congratulatory note to Mikawa on his victory, stating, "Appreciate the courageous and hard fighting of every man of your organization. I expect you to expand your exploits and you will make every effort to support the land forces of the Imperial army which are now engaged in a desperate struggle." Later on, though, when it became apparent that Mikawa had missed an opportunity to destroy the Allied transports, he was intensely criticised by his comrades.

Tactical result
From the time of the battle until several months later, almost all Allied supplies and reinforcements sent to Guadalcanal came by transports in small convoys, mainly during daylight hours, while Allied aircraft from the New Hebrides and Henderson Field and any available aircraft carriers flew covering missions. During this time, Allied forces on Guadalcanal received barely enough ammunition and provisions to withstand the several Japanese drives to retake the islands.

Despite their defeat in this battle, the Allies eventually won the battle for Guadalcanal, an important step in the defeat of Japan. In hindsight, according to Richard B. Frank, if Mikawa had elected to risk his ships to go after the Allied transports on the morning of August 9, he could have improved the chances of Japanese victory in the Guadalcanal campaign at its inception, and the course of the war in the southern Pacific could have gone much differently. Although the Allied warships at Guadalcanal that night were completely routed, the transports were unaffected. Many of these same transports were later used many times to bring crucial supplies and reinforcements to Allied forces on Guadalcanal over succeeding months. Mikawa's decision not to destroy the Allied transport ships when he had the opportunity proved to be a crucial strategic mistake for the Japanese.

U.S. Navy board of inquiry

A formal United States Navy board of inquiry, known as the Hepburn Investigation, prepared a report of the battle. The board interviewed most of the major Allied officers involved over several months, beginning in December.  The report recommended official censure for only one officer, Captain Howard D. Bode of the Chicago, for failing to broadcast a warning to the fleet of encroaching enemy ships. The report stopped short of recommending formal action against other Allied officers, including Admirals Fletcher, Turner, McCain, and Crutchley, and Captain Riefkohl. The careers of Turner, Crutchley, and McCain do not appear to have been affected by the defeat or the mistakes they made in contributing to it. Riefkohl never commanded ships again. Captain Bode, upon learning that the report was going to be especially critical of his actions, shot himself in his quarters at Balboa, Panama Canal Zone, on April 19, 1943, and died the next day. Crutchley was later gazetted with the Legion of Merit (Chief Commander).

Admiral Turner assessed why his forces were so soundly defeated in the battle:

Historian Frank adds that "This lethargy of mind would not be completely shaken off without some more hard blows to (U.S.) Navy pride around Guadalcanal, but after Savo, the United States picked itself up off the deck and prepared for the most savage combat in its history."

The report of the inquiry caused the US Navy to make many operational, and structural, changes. All the earlier models of US Navy cruisers were retrofitted with emergency diesel-electric generators. The fire mains of the ships were changed to a vertical loop design that could be broken many times and still function.

During the battle at Savo, many ship fires were attributed to aviation facilities filled with gas, oil, and planes. Motorboats were filled with gasoline and also caught fire. In some cases, these facilities were dead amidships, presenting a perfect target for enemy ships at night. Ready-service lockers (lockers containing ammunition that is armed and ready for use) added to the destruction, and it was noted that the lockers were never close to being depleted, i.e., they contained much more dangerous ammunition than they needed to. A focus was put on removing or minimizing flammable amidship materials.

Admiral Ernest King, the commander in chief of the United States Fleet, ordered sweeping changes to be made before ships entered surface combat in the future.

See also
 The Second Battle of Savo Island (a.k.a. the Battle of Cape Esperance)
 The Third Battle of Savo Island (a.k.a. the Naval Battle of Guadalcanal)
 The Fourth Battle of Savo Island (a.k.a. the Battle of Tassafaronga)

References

Works cited 
 
 
 
 
 
 Johnson, William Bruce. The Pacific Campaign in World War II: From Pearl Harbor to Guadalcanal. London; New York: Routledge, 2006. .
 Leckie, Robert. Strong Men Armed: The United States Marines Against Japan. Da Capo Press, 2011. Originally published: New York: Random House, 1962. .

Further reading

External links

 
 
 
 
 
 

Conflicts in 1942
Pacific Ocean theatre of World War II
1942 in the Solomon Islands
Battles and operations of World War II involving the Solomon Islands
Naval battles of World War II involving Australia
Naval battles of World War II involving Japan
Naval battles of World War II involving the United States
Military history of Japan during World War II
1942 in Japan
Night battles
August 1942 events